Brownstown Central High School is a public high school located in Brownstown, Indiana.

See also
 List of high schools in Indiana

References

External links
 Official Website

Public high schools in Indiana
Buildings and structures in Jackson County, Indiana